Andreyevka is a rural locality (a village) in Orlovsky Selsoviet, Arkhangelsky District, Bashkortostan, Russia. The population was 46 as of 2010. There is 1 street.

Geography 
Andreyevka is located 21 km southwest of Arkhangelskoye (the district's administrative centre) by road. Abdullino is the nearest rural locality.

References 

Rural localities in Arkhangelsky District